Peter von Poehl (born 31 March 1972) is a Swedish singer-songwriter, composer, musician and director

Career
Poehl was born in Malmö. In the early 2000s he collaborated extensively with Bertrand Burgalat and his label Tricatel, notably on Michel Houellebecq's album "Présence humaine" (2000). For the tour that followed the album, v Poehl cast a group of musicians in Paris that was to become A.S Dragon, the backing band of the label. Over the next two years, the group lent its services to artist such as Alain Chamfort, Depeche Mode and Burgalat himself. When the label's recording studio in Paris closed,  v Poehl, went to produce records for other artists, many of them part of the French music scene, such as Doriand ("Le Grand Bain"), Lio ("Dites au Prince Charmant"), Florian Horwath ("We Are All Gold") Vincent Delerm ("Les Piqûres d’araignée") Marie Modiano ("Outland")

Albums
V Poehl's first solo album (Going To Where The Tea Trees Are) was released in 2006 by French label Tôt ou tard, followed by different indie labels around the world, such as Bella Union (UK), World's Fair (US) and Speak n' Spell (AUS). The album was greeted by critical acclaim and the featuring of several songs – notably "The Story Of The Impossible" – in cinema and advertising helped introduce v Poehl's music to a large audience. The album was followed by extensive touring, including supporting artists, such as AIR, St Vincent, Phoenix and Brian Wilson.

Follow up May Day was released in 2009. Just as v Poehl's debut, it was co-produced with Christoffer Lundquist and recorded at AGM in the south of Sweden. Again extensive touring followed the release, headlining and sharing the bill with artists such as Ben Harper, Wild beasts and Peter Doherty. He also represented Sweden at the Expo 2010 in Shanghai.

Big Issues Printed Small was released in 2013. It was recorded live in the studio with an 18 piece formation, featuring orchestral arrangements by Swedish musician Martin Hederos.

Sympathetic Magic was released in 2017.

Other compositions
V Poehl has equally composed soundtracks for films, such as Kristina Buozyté's "Vanishing Waves" (2012) and Valerie Donzelli's "Main Dans La Main" (2012), the highly awaited follow-up of "La Guerre est Déclarée" (2011), which also featured music by von Poehl.
Peter von Poehl has composed original music for Simon Backès' documentary about J.R.R. Tolkien's work and words (2014).

Discography
 Going to Where the Tea-Trees Are (2006)
Going to Where the Tea-Trees Are
Tooth Fairy Tale
Travelers
Virgin Mountains
A Broken Skeleton Key
Global Conspiracy
Scorpion Grass
The Story of the Impossible
Tooth Fairy Tale Part II
The Lottery
Little Creatures
The Bell Tolls Five
 May Day (2009)
Parliament
Dust of Heaven
Forgotten Garden
Near the End of the World
Carrier Pigeon
Mexico
Mexico Part II
Moon Shot Falls
May Day
Wombara
Lost in Space
Silent as Gold
Elisabeth
An Eye for an Eye
Big Issues Printed Small (2013)
Orders and Degrees
Lover's Leap
Pious Man
The Archaeologist
To the Golden Rose
Big Issues Printed Small
Pen Friend
Twelve Twenty One
This One's for You
28 Paradise
Sympathetic Magic (2017)
Grubbed Up Pt 1
Inertia
The Go Between
A Stack Of Fire Wood
Sympathetic Magic
Late Arrivals
King's Ransom
Tired Retainers
The Early Hours
Grubbed Up Pt 2
Elysium
Memories From Saint-Forget (2021)

External links
Official website
 On the Tôt ou tard website
SEEN: Download Peter Von Poehl
Peter Von Poehl talks about some of his favorite songs
 

Swedish composers
Swedish male composers
Swedish singer-songwriters
Swedish guitarists
Male guitarists
Swedish people of German descent
1972 births
Living people
Best Original Score Guldbagge Award winners
21st-century Swedish singers
21st-century guitarists
Male film score composers
21st-century Swedish male singers
Bella Union artists